Working Woman is a 2018 Israeli drama film directed by Michal Aviad. It was screened in the Contemporary World Cinema section at the 2018 Toronto International Film Festival.

Plot
Orna (Ben-Shlush) is a married mother of three. Her husband, Ofer (Cohen) recently opened a restaurant, and is struggling financially. She decides to pursue a new career in real estate development, working as a coordinator and project manager for Benny (Noy), a successful developer who is building a luxury condominium complex on the shore of the city of Rishon Lezion. As Orna discovers her talents and abilities in her challenging chosen field, and feels she is growing and succeeding as a person, she simultaneously needs to deal with her husband's jealousy and Benny's growing obsession with her, and accompanying abuse of power.

Cast
 Liron Ben-Shlush
 Oshri Cohen
 Menashe Noy

Reception

Critical reception
Working Woman received critical praise. On review aggregator website Rotten Tomatoes, the film holds an approval rating of  based on  reviews. The critics consensus reads "Working Woman delivers its timely message with a polemical force that hits hard without overpowering the engrossing story." On Metacritic, the film has a weighted average score of 79 out of 100, based on 11 critics, indicating generally favorable reviews.

Ron Fogel, in his review for The Israeli Film Portal, likened the mood of Aviad's work to that of David Lynch, and described being "riveted to [his] seat" both times he viewed the film. He praised the lead actors' performances as "amazing", and lauded Daniel Miller's cinematography, as providing an effective and powerful vehicle to depict Orna's world at various stages, from her feelings of fear and claustrophobia, to when she feels as powerful as a lioness. As did Fogel, film critic Shmulik Duvdevani also attributed the film as a phenomenon of the #MeToo era, and expressed his appreciation of the fact that although the film was initially crowned "the first film of the MeToo era", preceding even Hollywood, that its qualities transcend the "message" and stand on their own, both due to Aviad's craft and the stunning performances delivered by the cast.

Monica Castillo, on behalf of RobertEbert.com, found the film to be "a story that's timely yet timeless", and assessed the film "a part of that global and cultural conversation, yet it never loses that personal focus of one woman’s experience." The Washington Post reviewer Vanessa H. Larson found the story "commendably relatable," yet at times too familiar. She did, however, comment the "particularly clear-eyed and realistic way the predicament that far too many women find themselves in, through no fault of their own. It also shows how both subtle and coercive sexual harassment can be. Aside from one especially horrendous moment, the film is set to more a simmer than a boil, deftly capturing the insidiousness of the problem."

In his Los Angeles Times review, Kenneth Turan states that "The #MeToo movement has found its film." Like some other critics, Turan expressed how impressed he was that though the direction of the film is clear from the outset, Aviad and the writers nevertheless created a well-paced, compelling, persuasive, and relevant work that engages and affects the viewer emotionally. The newspaper ranked Working Woman as one of the Ten Best Films of the first half of 2019. Additional positive reviews were published in The New York Times, The Wall Street Journal, Le Figaro, The Boston Globe, and other international publications.

Awards

References

External links
 
 Being a working woman - on and off screen, The Jewish Chronicle

2018 films
2018 drama films
Israeli drama films
2010s Hebrew-language films